Love & Life: The Very Best of Diana Ross is a compilation album by American singer Diana Ross. It was released by EMI in 2001. The double disc, 41-track album, which was not released commercially in the United States, details Ross' career as a solo artist and with The Supremes. Also included are duets with singers Lionel Richie, Marvin Gaye, and R&B band The Temptations ("I'm Gonna Make You Love Me" sung with The Supremes).  A single-disc edition of Love & Life: The Very Best of Diana Ross was also released, featuring Ross' 1995 cover of "I Will Survive."

The album became a top thirty success in the United Kingdom, where it peaked it number 28 on the UK Albums Chart, and was eventually certified platinum by the British Phonographic Industry (BPI)  for sales in excess of 300,000 copies. The only new track in the set, a cover of the Goffin-King song "Goin' Back," a 1966 international hit for English singer Dusty Springfield, recorded especially for this collection and served as a single in several markets.

Critical reception

Allmusic editor Andrew Hamilton called the compilation a "splendid [...] very comprehensive and thoughtfully chosen package [...] This is as good as it gets. Compiling a more complete and pleasing package with the same number of tracks to work with will never happen. The circus-sounding "The Happening" is a nuisance, but you can skip or program it out entirely if it bothers you."

Track listings

Double disc edition

Single disc edition

Charts

Weekly charts

Year-end charts

Certifications

References

2001 greatest hits albums
Diana Ross compilation albums
EMI Records compilation albums